Yoanner Negrín (born April 29, 1984) is a  professional baseball player who is currently with the Leones de Yucatán of the Mexican Baseball League. He was signed by the Cubs as a non-drafted free agent on July 25, 2011, and began his professional career with the Arizona League Cubs. In 2012, he spent most of the season on loan to the Mexican League and pitched in 24 games (with 16 starts) for the Olmecas de Tabasco. He played for the Spain national baseball team in the  2013 World Baseball Classic.

Career
On July 25, 2011, Negrín signed with the Chicago Cubs as an undrafted free agent and began his career with the Arizona League Cubs. He began the 2012 season with the Daytona Cubs, but was loaned to the Olmecas de Tabasco with whom he pitched in 24 games for, before being returned to the Cubs organization. Negrín played in the Cubs organization through the 2015 season, and on June 23, 2015, Negrín was loaned to the Leones de Yucatán. Negrín did not play in a game in 2020 due to the cancellation of the Mexican League season because of the COVID-19 pandemic.

International career
Negrín was selected to represent Spain at the 2023 World Baseball Classic qualification.

References

External links

1984 births
Baseball pitchers
Living people
2013 World Baseball Classic players
Arizona League Cubs players
Peoria Chiefs players
Daytona Cubs players
Olmecas de Tabasco players
Tennessee Smokies players
Iowa Cubs players
Cocodrilos de Matanzas players
Leones del Caracas players
Cuban expatriate baseball players in Venezuela
Yaquis de Obregón players
Cuban expatriate baseball players in Mexico